Allan Melrose Sliman (27 February 1906 – 14 April 1945), sometimes known as Jack Sliman, was a Scottish professional footballer who made over 370 Football League appearances for Chesterfield and Bristol City as a centre half. He also had a spell as player-manager of non-League club Chelmsford City.

Career
A centre half, Sliman began his career with Scottish League Second Division club Arthurlie, before Bristol City manager Alex Raisbeck paid a £280 fee to bring him to the Second Division club in September 1928. After making 136 league appearances for Bristol City, Sliman joined Second Division club Chesterfield for a £1,738 fee on 4 March 1932. He remained at Saltergate until October 1938 and was a part of the club's 1935–36 Third Division South title-winning team. Sliman finished his career with Southern League club Chelmsford City during the 1938–39 season and aside from captaining the club, he held the role of player-manager between October 1938 and March 1939.

Personal life 
Sliman's younger brother Richard was an amateur footballer. Before and after his professional football career, he worked as a carpenter. In 1943, during the Second World War, Sliman joined the Royal Air Force Volunteer Reserve and became a flight engineer with No. 75 Squadron. On 14 April 1945, Sliman took part in his first bombing mission, targeting a location southwest of Potsdam. During the return trip to England, Sliman's bomber was attacked by Junkers Ju 88s and he was fatally wounded by cannon fire. He died in hospital in Ely and was buried in Chelmsford Cemetery.

Honours
Chesterfield
Football League Third Division North (1): 1935–36
Derbyshire Senior Cup (2): 1932–33, 1936–37
Chesterfield Hospital Senior Cup (2): 1935–36, 1936–37
Mansfield Charity Cup (1): 1936–37

Career statistics

References

1906 births
1945 deaths
Scottish footballers
English Football League players
Arthurlie F.C. players
Bristol City F.C. players
Chesterfield F.C. players
Chelmsford City F.C. players
Association football wing halves
Scottish Football League players
People from Busby, East Renfrewshire
Royal Air Force personnel killed in World War II
Royal Air Force Volunteer Reserve personnel of World War II
Southern Football League players
Southern Football League managers
Chelmsford City F.C. managers
Scottish football managers
Sportspeople from East Renfrewshire
Royal Air Force airmen
West Ham United F.C. wartime guest players
Scottish military personnel